Luc de La Barre de Nanteuil (21 September 1925 at Lhommaizé - 14 August 2018 in Lhommaizé) was a French career diplomat, who rose to become an Ambassador of France.

Son of Jean de La Barre de Nanteuil and Marguerite Robert de Beauchamp, he graduated from the École nationale d'administration (ENA) in Paris, before joining the French diplomatic service at the Quai d'Orsay.

La Barre de Nanteuil started his career serving in the Middle East before being posted as the Ambassador to the Netherlands in 1976 and 1977. He was quickly transferred to represent France as the Permanent Representative to the European Union (EU), serving until 1981. He was posted to New York as President of the United Nations Security Council and then back to Brussels as the Permanent Representative to the EU, before being promoted Ambassador to the United Kingdom. He served in London from 1986 until retiring from French diplomatic circles in 1990.

La Barre de Nanteuil subsequently was Chairman of Les Echos Group from 1991 until 2003.

He had two children and lived in Paris with his second wife Hedwige, née Frèrejean de Chavagneux.

Honours 
  Officier, Légion d'honneur,
  Commandeur, Ordre national du Mérite;

La Barre de Nanteuil was granted the title and style of Ambassadeur de France (ad vitam) in 1991, by President François Mitterrand.

Publication 
 Jacques-Louis David, 1985.

References

External links 
 www.whoswho.fr
 Généalogie des La Barre de Nanteuil

1925 births
2018 deaths
Diplomats from Paris
University of Paris alumni
École nationale d'administration alumni
French noble families
Viscounts of France
20th-century French diplomats
Permanent Representatives of France to the United Nations
Ambassadors of France to the United Kingdom
Ambassadors of France to the Netherlands
Permanent Representatives of France to the European Union
European Union diplomats
French non-fiction writers
Commanders of the Ordre national du Mérite
Officiers of the Légion d'honneur
French male non-fiction writers
French officials of the European Union